The 72nd Street station is a local station on the IND Eighth Avenue Line of the New York City Subway. It is located at 72nd Street and Central Park West on the Upper West Side. It is served by the B on weekdays, the C train at all times except nights, and the A train during late nights only.

History 

The station opened on September 10, 1932, as part of the city-operated Independent Subway System (IND)'s initial segment, the Eighth Avenue Line between Chambers Street and 207th Street. While the IRT Broadway–Seventh Avenue Line already provided parallel service, the new Eighth Avenue subway via Central Park West provided an alternative route.

Under the 2015–2019 Metropolitan Transportation Authority Capital Plan, the station underwent a complete overhaul as part of the Enhanced Station Initiative and was entirely closed for several months. Updates included cellular service, Wi-Fi, USB charging stations, interactive service advisories and maps. A request for proposals for the 72nd Street, 86th Street, Cathedral Parkway–110th Street, and 163rd Street–Amsterdam Avenue stations was issued on June 1, 2017, and the New York City Transit and Bus Committee officially recommended that the MTA Board award the $111 million contract to ECCO III Enterprises in October 2017. As part of the renovations, the station was closed from May 7, 2018, to October 4, 2018.

Station layout

This underground station has two levels, each of which has from west to east, one side platform, one local track and one express track. Northbound trains stop on the upper level while southbound trains stop on the lower level.

Both platforms lack a trim line, but have mosaic name tablets reading "72ND ST." in white sans-serif lettering on a midnight blue background and black border, as well as small "72" tile captions in white numbering on a black background at regular intervals. Directional signs in white lettering on a black background are below the name tablets. Mosaic signs in white lettering on a blue background on the upper level direct passengers to the staircases going down to the lower level. Grey (previously blue) I-beam columns run along the platforms at regular intervals, alternating ones having the standard black station name plate with white lettering.

72nd Street is the closest station to both the Dakota apartment building (which is immediately outside the station) and the Strawberry Fields memorial in Central Park. The 2018 artwork at this station is "Sky", a ceramic artwork by Yoko Ono, who lived in the Dakota. The artwork consists of clouds against a blue backdrop. "Sky" commemorates Ono's late husband John Lennon, who was killed in 1980 outside the Dakota.

Exits

Both fare control areas are on the upper-level platform and two staircases, one adjacent to each area, go down to the lower level. The full-time one at 72nd Street is at the north end of the platform. A staircase of four steps go down to a bank of three turnstiles that lead to a token booth. The other fare control area at 70th Street, at the station's south end, is unstaffed, containing High Entry/Exit Turnstiles.

Two staircases connect the two platforms, one at each fare control area, and one more used to connect the platforms in the center of the station. There are staircases to both western corners of West 72nd Street and Central Park West. The northwest staircase, outside the Dakota apartment building, is made of stone and is embedded within the Dakota's recessed areaway. In addition, there is an entrance to the southwestern corner of West 70th Street and Central Park West. This entrance had previously been closed, but reopened in September 2002.

Blue plywood walls and new tiling with a door on the upper level indicate there was a third exit that led to West 71st Street. Prior to the renovation of the station, further evidence of this exit's existence included directional signs with "71" that were covered or replaced with newer tiling and a fenced off staircase on the lower level. During the renovation of the station, the exit and its accompanying staircase between the two platform levels was temporarily uncovered and used as an area to haul out construction debris; the street staircase has since been re-sealed and the staircase between the two platform levels was closed again.

In film

The station entrance is seen in the Blue's Clues episode "Shape Searchers" during mail time as kids look for shapes.

References

External links 

 
 Station Reporter — B Train
 Station Reporter — C Train
 72nd Street entrance from Google Maps Street View
 70th Street entrance from Google Maps Street View
 Upper platform from Google Maps Street View

IND Eighth Avenue Line stations
Eighth Avenue (Manhattan)
New York City Subway stations in Manhattan
Railway stations in the United States opened in 1932
Upper West Side
Central Park
1932 establishments in New York City